Lincoln Highway had two different routes through Indiana, the original route went through South Bend and Elkhart. The Lincoln Highway's northern alignment is now called Lincoln Way and is a byway.

Route description

Illinois to Valparaiso 
The western end of the Lincoln Highway in Indiana was at the Illinois state line.  The Lincoln Highway headed east passing through Dyer, still heading east the Lincoln Highway headed north around Schererville.  Leaving US 30 and heading east, running one mile north of US 30, through Merrillville.  East of Merrillville Lincoln Highway rejoins US 30, before leaving US 30 west of Valparaiso.

Valparaiso to Fort Wayne 
There were two routes from Valparaiso to Fort Wayne.  The first route went farther north passing through South Bend, Elkhart, and Goshen.  The second route was the most direct route from Valparaiso to Fort Wayne, passing through Plymouth, Warsaw, and Columbia City.

Fort Wayne to Ohio

References 

Indiana
U.S. Route 30